Spirit of the Age is a 1975 documentary series of "Eight films on eight centuries of British Architecture". It was broadcast on BBC 2 between 31 October 1975 and 19 December 1975 as the BBC's contribution to the Council of Europe's European Architectural Heritage Year.

Each episode examined a different era of British architecture was presented by an expert in his field. It was series produced by the arts specialist John Drummond. Its title music was a specially-composed fanfare by the Master of the Queen's Music, Sir Arthur Bliss.

A book of the same name was published to accompany the television series by BBC Books in 1975, later reprinted in 1992. The series was repeated in May 1976, when a studio discussion "In Search of the Spirit of the Age" featuring Alec Clifton-Taylor and John Julius Norwich was broadcast to introduce the series. The first episode, presented by Alec Clifton-Taylor, was his first television presenting experience, but led to Six English Towns which ran for three series from 1978.

List of episodes

References

1975 British television series debuts
BBC television documentaries